Mayur Times is a novel by Nepali author Narayan Wagle. It tells the story of Parag and Lisara, two friends of different ethnicity from Parag's POV during the transitional period of Nepal. They both work for a Newspaper called Mayur Times.

References

External links
Review in the Nepali Times

Nepalese novels
2010 novels
21st-century Nepalese novels
Works about the Nepalese Civil War
2010 Nepalese novels
Nepali-language novels